The Sun and the Moon is the second album by New York-based rock band The Bravery. The album was produced by Brendan O'Brien and released in the United States on May 22, 2007 (see 2007 in music).

The album's title comes from lyrics in both "Angelina" and "The Ocean".

Reception

Critical reception

The Sun and the Moon received mixed reviews from music critics. It currently holds a 62/100 on Metacritic with reviews such as the Boston Globe awarding the album a 9/10 and saying "This easily ranks among the top rock records of the year." Other publications, while giving it a positive review, said it was a slight slump compared to their self-titled debut, although noting the slump was not as great as those from the Kaiser Chiefs, Bloc Party and Editors. Pitchfork wrote a scathing review, giving the album a low 1.8, and ending their angry review with the question "Have you no sense of decency, Bravery?".

Commercial performance
The album debuted at number 24 on the US Billboard 200, selling about 22,000 copies in its first week.

Track listing

Bonus tracks/B-sides
"Rat in the Walls" – 3:03 (Best Buy bonus disc)
"Faces" – 2:56 (Best Buy bonus disc)
"Who Left Me Out?" – 2:33 (Newbury Comics/Rhino Records bonus disc)
"Sorrow" – 2:25 (Newbury Comics/Rhino Records bonus disc and "Time Won't Let Me Go" single)
"The Dandy (Rock)" – 3:33 (German iTunes Store)

Singles
"Time Won't Let Me Go" - No. 10 US Modern Rock
"Believe" - No. 4 US Modern Rock

Other non-album songs
"Shapes" (unreleased)
"Satellite of Love" (unreleased)
"Rocket"

The band's official website has been updating their websites with sneak peeks of the band warming up during their "Secret Shows" for acoustic renditions of the songs from the album, notably "This Is Not the End" and "Angelina".

Personnel
Sam Endicott - lead vocals, rhythm guitar
Michael Zakarin - lead guitar, backing vocals
John Conway - keyboards, backing vocals
Mike Hindert - bass, backing vocals
Anthony Burulcich - drums, backing vocals

Popular culture
The song "Believe" has been used in numerous media:
as a playable song in the video game Band Hero.
as the theme music for NFL Network's coverage of the 2008 NFL draft.
in the trailer for the movie Henry Poole Is Here.
in the TV series Prison Break, in the episode "Five the Hard Way".
in the video game Madden NFL 08.
in an episode of the TV series Gossip Girl and The Hills.
in TV commercials for the New York Rangers, as well as for the Dallas Stars' 2008 Stanley Cup playoffs.
in TV commercials promoting ABC's soap opera couples, such as Maxie Jones and Damian Spinelli from General Hospital.
in the second episode of the comedy-drama TV series Reaper.
in the jukebox at the Pontiac official website.
in the promo for ABC's TV series FlashForward.
in promos for NBC's TV series Friday Night Lights season 2 premiere.
in 2009, Seattle emcee Macklemore and producer Ryan Lewis sampled the song "Believe" for "Crew Cuts", a track that was an ode to 80's pop culture on their critically acclaimed project, The VS. EP.

The song "The Ocean" was featured in an episode of the TV series Grey's Anatomy on ABC.

The song "Above and Below" was featured in the end credits for the 2009 film Forget Me Not.

The song "Time Won't Let Me Go" was featured in NBC's TV series Las Vegas, season 5, episode 5, "Run Copper Run"; in the commercial for the Chicago Bears and Green Bay Packers playoff game; and in the ending credits for the 2008 film Never Back Down.

A song by Bus Stop, from their self-titled album, is called "The Sun and the Moon" and was released as the album's first single.

References

Review link
The Bravery: The Sun and the Moon (2007): Reviews at Metacritic

2007 albums
Island Records albums
The Bravery albums
Albums produced by Brendan O'Brien (record producer)